Teun Adrianus van Dijk (born May 7, 1943, in Naaldwijk, German-occcupied Netherlands) is a scholar in the fields of text linguistics, discourse analysis and Critical Discourse Analysis (CDA).

With Walter Kintsch he contributed to the development of the psychology of text processing. Since the 1980s his work in CDA focused especially on the study of the discursive reproduction of racism by what he calls the 'symbolic elites' (politicians, journalists, scholars, writers), the study of news in the press, and on the theories of ideology, context and knowledge.

He founded six international journals: Poetics, Text (now called Text & Talk), Discourse & Society, Discourse Studies, Discourse & Communication, of which he still edits the last three.

Teun A. van Dijk was a professor of discourse studies at the University of Amsterdam from 1968 until 2004, and since 1999 he has taught at the Pompeu Fabra University, Barcelona. In 2017 he founded the Centre of Discourse Studies in Barcelona. 

He has widely lectured internationally, especially in Latin America.

Selected bibliography

 Some aspects of text grammars. A Study in theoretical poetics and linguistics. The Hague: Mouton, 1972.
 Text and context. Explorations in the semantics and pragmatics of discourse. London: Longman, 1977.
 Macrostructures. An interdisciplinary study of global structures in discourse, interaction, and cognition. Hillsdale, NJ: Erlbaum.
 Studies in the pragmatics of discourse. The Hague/Berlin: Mouton, 1981.
 Prejudice in discourse. Amsterdam: Benjamins, 1984.
 Communicating Racism. Ethnic Prejudice in Thought and Talk. Newbury Park, CA: Sage, 1987.
 News as Discourse. Hillsdale, NJ: Erlbaum, 1988.
 News Analysis. Case studies of international and national news in the press. Hillsdale, NJ: Erlbaum, 1988.
 Racism and the Press. London: Routledge, 1991.
 Elite discourse and racism. Newbury Park, CA: SAGE, 1993.
 Ideology: A Multidisciplinary Approach. London: Sage, 1998.
 Racism and Discourse in Spain and Latin America. Amsterdam: Benjamins, 2005.
 Discourse and Context. A sociocognitive approach. Cambridge: Cambridge University Press, 2008.
 Society and Discourse. How social contexts control text and talk.. Cambridge: Cambridge University Press, 2009.
 Discourse and Power. Contributions to Critical Discourse Studies. Houndsmills: Palgrave MacMillan, 2008.
 Discourse and Knowledge. A sociocognitive approach. Cambridge: Cambridge University Press, 2014.
 Strategies of Discourse Comprehension. with Walter Kintsch. New York: Academic Press, 1983.

Edited books
 Pragmatics of language and literature. Amsterdam: North Holland, 1976.
 Handbook of Discourse Analysis. 4 vols. London: Academic Press, 1985.
 Discourse and communication. Berlin/New York: de Gruyter, 1985.
 Discourse Studies. A multidisciplinary introduction. 2 vols. London: Sage, 1997. Second, one-volume edition, 2011.
 Discourse Studies. 5 vols. Sage Benchmark Series. New Delhi: Sage, 2007.
 Discourse and Discrimination. With Geneva Smitherman-Donaldson. Detroit, MI: Wayne State University Press, 1988.
 Racism at the Top. Parliamentary Discourses on Ethnic Issues in Six European Countries. With Ruth Wodak. Klagenfurt: Drava Verlag, 2000.
 Communicating Ideologies. Multidisciplinary Perspectives on Language, Discourse and Social Practice. With Martin Pütz and JoAnne Neff-van Aertselaer. Frankfurt/Main: Peter Lang, 2004.
 Racism and Discourse in Latin America. Lanham, Md: Lexington Books, 2009.

References

External links
 Personal website

1943 births
Living people
Linguists from the Netherlands
Academic staff of the University of Amsterdam
People from Naaldwijk
Academic staff of Pompeu Fabra University
Discourse analysts